North Oakland may refer to:

 North Oakland, California
 North Oakland, Pittsburgh, Pennsylvania